Sinjaeviella renatae is a species of moth of the family Cossidae. It is found in Ghana.

References

Moths described in 2011
Zeuzerinae